This article lists the largest electrical generating stations in Canada in terms of current installed electrical capacity. Non-renewable power stations are those that run on coal, fuel oils, nuclear, natural gas, oil shale and peat, while renewable power stations run on fuel sources such as biomass, geothermal heat, hydro, solar energy, solar heat, tides, waves and wind.

As of 2022 the largest power generating facility is the Bruce Nuclear Generating Station in Ontario and has an installed capacity of 6,430 MW.

Largest power stations 
List of the electrical generating facilities in Canada with a current installed capacity of at least 250 MW.

Notes

Largest power stations under construction 
List of the electrical generating facilities under construction in Canada with an expected installed capacity of at least 250 MW.

Largest decommissioned power stations 
List of former electrical generating facilities in Canada that had an installed capacity of at least 250 MW at the time of their decommissioning. Only facilities that have permanently shut down all of their electricity generating units are included.

See also 

List of largest power stations in the world
List of power stations in Canada by type
Electricity sector in Canada
Energy policy of Canada

References

External links 

 Wind Energy Programs of Natural Resources Canada
"Where is my Electricity Coming From at this Hour? (if I lived in Ontario)" (Canadian Nuclear Society, with data from IESO)
Know your power (Includes a map of electric generating stations across Canada)

Canada
Lists of power stations in Canada
Power stations in Canada